Gagnea is a genus of wood midges, insects in the family Cecidomyiidae. The one described species - Gagnea tsutaensis - is known only from Japan. The genus was established by Mathias Jaschhof in 2001 and named after American entomologist Raymond Gagné.

References

Cecidomyiidae genera

Taxa named by Mathias Jaschhof
Insects described in 2001
Monotypic Diptera genera
Insects of Japan
Diptera of Asia